Calanna is a comune (municipality) in the Metropolitan City of Reggio Calabria in the Italian region Calabria, located about  southwest of Catanzaro and about  northeast of Reggio Calabria.  

Calanna borders the following municipalities: Fiumara, Laganadi, Reggio Calabria, San Roberto.

References

Cities and towns in Calabria